Mount Langway is a coastal mountain,  high, located  southwest of Mount LeMasurier in the Ickes Mountains of Marie Byrd Land, Antarctica. The mountain was first photographed from aircraft of the United States Antarctic Service, 1939–41, and it was named by the Advisory Committee on Antarctic Names for Chester C. Langway, a United States Antarctic Research Program glaciologist at Byrd Station, 1968–69.

References

Mountains of Marie Byrd Land